James Patrick Seymour (November 24, 1946 – March 29, 2011) was an American football wide receiver who played three seasons for the Chicago Bears in the National Football League. He was originally selected by the Los Angeles Rams in the first round of the 1969 NFL Draft, 10th pick overall. In 1974, he played for the Chicago Fire of the WFL.

Seymour played high school football at Shrine of the Little Flower High School, Royal Oak, Michigan, and college football at Notre Dame, where he was a two-time First-team All-American (1967, 1968) while also being a Second-team All-America selection in 1966.  He is widely considered to be one of the Top 50 players in Notre Dame history, and is one of only five three-time football All-Americans at the school (Leon Hart, Ken MacAfee, Chris Zorich, Luther Bradley). Seymour was featured on the cover of Time Magazine in the October 28th, 1966 issue, along with Terry Hanratty. He was the older brother of former professional football player Paul Seymour.

He was traded along with Ron Smith from the Rams to the Bears for Dick Evey on September 1, 1970.

Seymour died on March 29, 2011 from cancer. He was buried in the Cedar Grove Cemetery in Notre Dame, Indiana.

References

External links
Obituary
 https://www.nytimes.com/2011/04/01/sports/football/01seymour.html?scp=1&sq=jim%20seymour&st=cse

1946 births
2011 deaths
People from Berkley, Michigan
Players of American football from Michigan
American football wide receivers
Notre Dame Fighting Irish football players
Chicago Bears players
Chicago Fire (WFL) players